(The) Sky's the Limit or The Sky's the Limit may refer to:

Film and television 
 Sky's the Limit, a 1925 American film directed by Harry L. Fraser
 The Sky's the Limit (1938 film), a British film
 The Sky's the Limit (1943 film), a musical comedy starring Fred Astaire and Joan Leslie
 The Sky's the Limit (1975 film), a 1975 Walt Disney film starring Pat O’Brien and Ike Eisenmann

Television
 The Sky's the Limit (game show), a 1970s UK TV game show
 "The Sky's the Limit" (Only Fools and Horses), a 1990 episode of Only Fools and Horses
 "...and the sky's the limit" are the last words in the series finale of Star Trek: The Next Generation
 The Sky's the Limit (Star Trek), a collection of short stories based on the Star Trek franchise

Music 
 Sky's the Limit (band), an early project of Mae co-founder Dave Elkins

Albums
 Sky's the Limit (The Temptations album), 1971
 Sky's the Limit (Magic album), or the title song
 The Sky’s the Limit (Horizon album), 2002
 The Sky's the Limit (Blackhawk album), 1998
 The Sky's the Limit (Dynamic Superiors album), 1980
 Sky's the Limit, a 1978 album by Rhythm Heritage
 Sky Is the Limit (DJ Antoine album), 2013
 Da Sky's da Limit, a 2002 album by Big Pokey

Songs
 "Sky's the Limit" (The Notorious B.I.G. song), a 1997 song by The Notorious B.I.G.
 "Sky's the Limit" (Ola song), 2009
 "Sky's the Limit", a single by Taufik Batisah and Rui En, 2013
 "Skies the Limit", a 1990 song by Fleetwood Mac
 "The Sky's the Limit" (song), a 2009 song by Jason Derülo
 "The Sky's the Limit", Dennis Alcapone	1972